Middle Fabius is an unincorporated community in Scotland County, in the U.S. state of Missouri.

History
A post office called Middle Fabius was established in 1841, and remained in operation until 1890. The community takes its name from the nearby Middle Fabius River.

References

Unincorporated communities in Scotland County, Missouri
Unincorporated communities in Missouri